FitTV was an American pay television channel, owned by Discovery Communications. The channel focused on fitness and exercise-related programming. FitTV offered programming with such fitness celebrities as Cathe Friedrich, Sharon Mann, Gilad Janklowicz, Marilu Henner, Tamilee Webb and others. On February 1, 2011, it merged with Discovery Health Channel to become Discovery Fit & Health, now known as Discovery Life.

History

Establishment
International Family Entertainment (IFE) introduced a continuous preview of the Cable Health Club on August 20, 1993. Beginning August 31 of that year, the channel would be available in a half-hour continuous programming format to cable system operators for free. In October, the channel moved to 24-hour programming. Jake Steinfeld, who had starred on the network's Big Brother Jake, hosted its first program and was a constant presence on the channel in its early years.

The original formatting of an hour on Cable Health Club included a 20-minute aerobic conditioning workout at the top of the hour featuring Tamilee Webb; a segment on healthy living; a Body by Jake workout starting at the bottom of the hour; and "Fitness Plus", a home shopping segment for fitness items and equipment.

In 1994, Cable Health Club received new sponsors and minority partners, Reebok International (its first charter advertiser) and Liberty Media. By this time, the channel was received in one million homes and carried for two hours a day on the Family Channel. By November 1994, the Club was sharing a channel with Prime Sports Northwest on Seattle cable.

In January 1997, Cox Communications paired the service with Home Team Sports between the hours of 5:30–11 a.m. The service took out full-page ads in The Virginian-Pilot newspaper through May 4, requesting viewers to call a toll free number to register support for the channel to be 24 hours with responses forwarded to Cox.

By April 1997, the Cable Health Club was renamed Fit TV. In June 1997, IFE was acquired by a joint venture of Fox Entertainment Group and Saban Entertainment; the companies were primarily targeting its sister network The Family Channel.

America's Health Network
America's Health Network was in separate operation from FitTV from March 1996 until 1999. The channel was based in Orlando, Florida and had an $11 million production center with  soundstage built at Universal Studios in late 1995. The executives at the channel were Joe Maddox (a former Discovery Channel executive) and Webster "Web" Golinkin, who had spent two and a half years planning, raising $75 million in capital, and building the channel. The majority owner was the Providence Journal Company. The channel also had a five-year agreement with Mayo Clinic and IVI Publishing, its electronic publisher, to provide medical information and illustrative graphics. Mayo and IVI were also minority owners of the channel, and other investors included venture capital firm Medical Innovation Partners, Inc.

15 minutes an hour on AHN was devoted to shopping. The "Health Mall" carried upscale, harder-to-find items for a healthy living. AHN had a deal with Clearwater, Florida-based Home Shopping Network to provide orders and shipping infrastructure. For cable operators, carriage deals included a small percentage of advertising and shopping revenue.

With an initial cable audience of 200,000 subscribers, America's Health Network had reached 700,000 subscribers by May 1996 and 6 million by the time of the sale of its first majority owners. However, cable carriage was a long struggle for AHN and other cable outlets that launched in this time frame (Electronic Media, now TV Week magazine, described the environment many cable networks launched in 1996 faced as a "jungle"). Time Warner Cable, the primary cable provider in Orlando, did not carry AHN, and so many people in the channel's own hometown were unable to see its programs.

Providence Journal acquisition
In 1997, Providence Journal was bought by the A.H. Belo Corporation. It was Belo's first venture into cable television; according to Golinkin, Belo did not desire to gain any market share in cable. 161 of the channel's 200 employees were laid off, and they ceased producing live programs. The 39 employees that remained (including the entire management team) were a skeleton crew to keep the channel running. A sale of most of the Belo stake to Columbia/HCA Health Care Corp. for $50 million was soon proposed. Columbia wanted to put AHN in its nearly 500 hospitals and surgery centers, plus many more outpatient clinics. However, during this time period, federal investigations over its billing practices; government raids; charges of Columbia officials with conspiracy and fraud; and changes in management at Columbia/HCA "turned [the company] upside down", according to a senior official. This turmoil spurred reviews of company strategies and the cancellation of some transactions, including the sale of the AHN stake. New York real estate tycoon Howard Milstein offered a bridge loan, which was accepted. Belo's stake eventually was brought back by AHN. An investment group of former Columbia/HCA officials, including Richard Scott and David Vandewater, took control of the network in late 1997, and live series resumed.

During this time, another minority investor in the channel was Access Health, a referral service.

1998–99: New milestones

On June 16, 1998, AHN presented the first human birth carried live over the Internet, from Orlando's Arnold Palmer Hospital for Children. The birth brought AHN major national and worldwide media attention and was even the focus of an editorial cartoon two days later in USA Today. By this time, it reached 8 million cable homes, comparable to the CNN/SI cable network (which would fold in 2002) and the Game Show Network.

By June 1999, Scott and Vandewater had reduced their stake in America's Health.

Shows in the AHN era
Ask the Doctor was a program where medical professionals took viewer calls in two-hour time blocks. At launch, AHN had hired 16 doctors, seven of them from the Orlando area. Shows filmed during Universal Studios theme park hours had studio audiences. By the time AHN ceased producing live series in 1997, it had filmed approximately 7,000 hours of studio shows.

Merger and acquisition
On September 12, 1999, Fox Cable Networks Group bought America's Health Network, owned by Rick Scott & David Vandewater, and merged it with FitTV, which Fox Cable already owned. The resulting network was named The Health Network. In December, Fox Cable sold 50% of the channel to WebMD.

By the start of the year 2000, The Health Network reached 17.5 million homes. At the start of 2000, the station began new headquarters in Los Angeles, and about half of its Orlando workforce was laid off, leaving 40 people out of work. The station also ran supplementary offices in New York and Nashville. At the time, The Health Network stated it was moving more of its production to New York and Los Angeles so it could feature more celebrities on its lineup. In the fall of 2000, it very nearly relaunched as WebMD Television, with new programs and the removal of the AHN studio program library from its schedule; that plan was put on hold, and Fox received the 50% of the channel it had sold back from WebMD, which had lost $2 billion in 2000.

On September 1, 2001, Discovery Communications bought The Health Network for $255 million in cash and equity. On January 1, 2004, Discovery reinstated the "FitTV" name, as Discovery recently owned its own health channel, Discovery Health.

In March 2006, New York-based Cablevision dropped the channel from its systems, resulting in the loss of some three million subscribers (down to 35 million). In January 2011, the channel's carriage remained significantly lower than most cable networks, only holding a reach of 50 million homes.

Back to "Health"

On January 1, 2011, Discovery Communications used the Discovery Health channel space to launch Oprah Winfrey Network. FitTV's programming was merged with the programming of its former sister station. Fitness-oriented programs moved to the mornings, and much of Discovery Health's content, including the former Discovery Health National Body Challenge, took up the remaining airtime.

On January 17, 2011, Discovery Communications announced that FitTV would be rebranded as Discovery Fit & Health on February 1, reflecting the addition of former Discovery Health programs to its lineup.

Former programs
 Total Body Sculpt with Gilad
 Shimmy
 Gilad's Bodies in Motion
 Namaste Yoga
 Power Hour
 In Shape with Sharon Mann
 Cathe Friedrich
 All Star Workouts
 Marilu Henner's Shape Up Your Life
 Art of the Athlete
 Blaine's Low Carb Kitchen
 FitNation
 Housecalls
 Ultimate Goals
 Diet Doctor
 The Gym
 No Opportunity Wasted
 Reunion Story
 Lyon in the Kitchen
 Get Fresh with Sara Snow
 Cardio Blast
 Caribbean Workout

References

Television channels and networks about health
Warner Bros. Discovery networks
English-language television stations in the United States
Television channels and stations established in 1993
Television channels and stations established in 1996
Television channels and stations disestablished in 2011
Former News Corporation subsidiaries